Devepora (also known as Dev Pora or Devpura) is a large village located in the forest block of Shopian district in the Indian union territory of Jammu and Kashmir. The village is located in hill area of district Shopian which is 6 kilometers away from its town. There is no hospital or primary health dispensary.

Population
According to 2011 census, Devepora  has a total of 1,424 families. The village has population of 8,275 of which 4,514 are males while remaining 3,761 are females. Average Sex Ratio of Devepora village is 833. Devepora village has very lower literacy rate compared to other villages in Jammu and Kashmir. In Devepora Male literacy stands at 38.66% while female literacy rate was 21.82%.

References

Villages in Shopian district